In the computer security or Information security fields, there are a number of tracks a professional can take to demonstrate qualifications. Four sources categorizing these, and many other credentials, licenses, and certifications, are:

 Schools and universities 
 Vendor-sponsored credentials (e.g. Microsoft, Cisco)
 Association- and organization-sponsored credentials
 Governmental (or quasi-governmental) licenses, certifications, and credentials

Quality and acceptance vary worldwide for IT security credentials, from well-known and high-quality examples like a master's degree in the field from an accredited school, CISSP, and Microsoft certification, to a controversial list of many dozens of lesser-known credentials and organizations.

In addition to certification obtained by taking courses and/or passing exams (and in the case of CISSP and others noted below, demonstrating experience and/or being recommended or given a reference from an existing credential holder), award certificates also are given for winning government, university or industry-sponsored competitions, including team competitions and contests.

Scope note: This article is about the certification and credentialing of individuals. It does not include certification of organizations or classified computer systems by authorizing, accrediting, and approval bodies and authorities as meeting a prescribed set of safeguards.

Certifying organizations

Vendor-neutral 
 Altered Security
 ASIS International
 APMG International
 Blockchain Council 
 Blockchain Training Alliance
 CCC
 CertificationPoint (SAC)
 CertNexus
 CompTIA 
 CREST
 Crypto Consortium
 Cloud Security Alliance (CSA)
 CWNP
 CyberDefenders
 Cyber Struggle
 EC Council
 EITCA/IS 
 eLearnSecurity
 EXIN
 GAQM
 GIAC 
 HISPI
 InfoSec Institute
 IBITGQ
 TCM Security
 The IIA
 IAPP
 ISACA
 ISECOM
 ISC2
 Lunarline
 McAfee Institute
 Mile2
 Offensive Security
 The Open Group
 SECO-Institute
 SABSA
 Star Certification
 Zero-Point Security
 EC First

Vendor-specific 
 Alibaba (Cloud)
 AWS
 Cisco
 Check Point
 Fortinet
 Google
 IBM
 Jamf
 Juniper
 Microsoft
 Kali
 OpenText
 Palo Alto
 Redhat
 Symantec, (since 2015 NortonLifeLock)

List of certifications

Vendor-neutral

Vendor-specific 

Microsoft 1 year * : you have to do a free refresh exam within 180 days before expiration. if not done, the certificate expire otherwise it extends by 1 year.

See also 

 Computer security
 Information security

Notes

References

External links 

 01
computer security certifications
computer security certifications
computer security certifications